Legend Quest (known as Leyendas in Latin America) is an animated horror-comedy film franchise created by Ricardo Arnaiz and produced by Mexican animation studio Ánima Estudios. It is loosely based on The Reluctant Dragon by Kenneth Grahame. It consists of six films, a digital television series, and a mobile game. It centers on Leo San Juan, a heroic preteen boy who can communicate with ghosts and monsters; Teodora, a sassy preteen ghost girl with a know-it-all personality; Don Andrés, an amicable but loony old knight; Alebrije, a mild-mannered mythological creature; and Finado and Moribunda, two silent calavera children. Set in the early nineteenth century, each of the films is based upon a different Mexican legend.

The franchise began in 2007 with the release of The Legend of La Nahuala, directed by creator Ricardo Arnaiz and produced by Soco Aguilar and Ricardo Arnaiz, Nahuala Producciones Cinematograficas S.de R.L. de C.V., and Puebla-based Animex Producciones. The film was later followed by The Legend of La Llorona in 2011, The Legend of the Guanajuato Mummies in 2014, The Legend of the Chupacabra in 2016, and The Legend of the Black Charro in 2018, with a sixth film, Legend Quest: The Origin, releasing in 2022. All films are produced by Ánima Estudios and directed and co-written by Alberto Rodríguez. The franchise has also been adted into a Netflix original series, simply titled Legend Quest.

It is one of the few film franchises in Mexico, which is a rare instance within the country's domestic film industry. As such, the franchise has become widely popular within the country and often achieves successful box-office numbers, with Black Charro currently being the highest-grossing film.

Films

The Legend of La Nahuala (2007)

The first film, The Legend of La Nahuala, was released on 1 November 2007 in Mexico with 350 copies, directed by Ricardo Arnaiz and produced by Soco Aguilar and Ricardo Arnaiz, Nahuala Producciones Cinematograficas S.de R.L. de C.V., and Animex Producciones. The film performed well at the Mexican box-office, grossing a total of $42.2 million pesos (US$4.03 million), which was one of the highest-grossing Mexican films at the time. Based on the Nagual legend mythology and receiving the support of the state of Puebla, the film was written by Omar Mustre and Antonio Garci, and featured the voices of famous Mexican actors, including Andrés Bustamante, Jesús Ochoa, Rafael Inclán, Martha Higareda, Manuel 'Loco' Valdés, and Pierre Angelo. Set in 1807 in the city of Puebla de Los Angeles, the film centers on Leo San Juan, a cowardly 9-year-old boy. He summons the courage to rescue his older brother, Nando, from an abandoned house possessed by an evil witch known as the 'Nahuala', with the aid of his new ghost friends. The success of the film launched a franchise, the license to which Arnaiz gave to Ánima Estudios.

The Legend of La Llorona (2011)

A sequel, The Legend of La Llorona, based on the La Llorona ("The Weeping Woman") legend, was released on 21 October 2011 with 225 to 300 copies. Unlike its predecessor, it was produced by Ánima Estudios and directed and co-written by Alberto Rodríguez, who, along with the studio, took over the production of further films. The film also uses flash animation, as well as its successors (excluding Chupacabra; see below). The film was written by Ricardo Arnaiz, the predecessor's director, Jesús Guzmán, and Omar Mustre, who also wrote the preceding film. Some of the previous film's voice cast reprised their roles, while some actors, such as Andrés Bustamante, were replaced by new voice actors. The film picks up where Nahuala ended and follows the new adventures of Leo San Juan and his gang, Don Andrés, Alebrije, Teodora, Finado and Moribunda. Taking place in ancient Xochimilco, Leo falls out of the crew's ship and meets a young village girl, named Kika, who is on her journey to find her lost brother, Beto. Leo and Kika encounter the 'Llorona', while the rest of his gang end up in the La Isla de las Muñecas ('The island of the dolls'). The film did not receive support from any Mexican state. It was another box-office success, earning $8 million pesos on its opening weekend, and grossing a total of $55.4 million pesos (US$2.9 million), performing better than its predecessor.

The Legend of the Guanajuato Mummies (2014)

The third film, The Legend of the Guanajuato Mummies, or simply The Legend of the Mummies, was released on 30 October 2014 with 700 copies in regular and 4DX formats, a first for a Mexican film. The film is a fictionalization of the origin of the mummies, notably from the Guanajuato region. It follows Leo San Juan and his gang in the city of Guanajuato, trying to find Xóchitl, who was kidnapped by Rosseau, an old wizard with the ability to awaken mummies from the dead. Along the way, Leo teams up with Valentina, disguised as her alter-ego Luis, who is on her own journey to find her father. Director Alberto Rodríguez returns to direct for the second time, and makes his writing debut, along with a screenplay by Jesús Guzmán, Ricardo Arnaiz, and Dulce María Guerrero. Mummies was not produced with the support of the Mexican federal government, due to disapproval; however, it did receive support from the state government of Guanajuato. Despite the lack of national support, Mummies was a major box-office success, and the first film in the series to surpass $50 million pesos; grossing a total of $92.25 million pesos (US$4.9 million). As the voice cast from Llorona reunited for the third film, among the newcomers was Benny Emmanuel, known for La CQ. He provided the voice of Leo San Juan, and has remained the character's voice actor since Mummies. Eduardo "Lalo" España, a Mexican actor and comedian, joined the cast as a new character, Evaristo, an alebrije with a smooth personality, while Alejandra Müller, a teen actress who is also an alumnus of La CQ, voiced Valentina, a girl who Leo helps find Rosseau.

The Legend of the Chupacabra (2016)

The Legend of the Chupacabra, the fourth film, was released on 21 October 2016. The story is based on the chupacabra creature. In the film, while on his way home to Puebla, Leo and his fellow rebel mates get caught up in a civil war, and they get locked up in Peñamiller. When the 'chupacabra' attacks the prison, Leo calls for the help of his friend, Teodora, to discover the origin of the creature as he escapes with his inmates. The films' past characters, including Don Andrés and Xochitl, were left absent, while Fernando "Nando" San Juan, Leo's older brother from Nahuala, makes a return to the franchise. The film also uses traditional animation, which is the first time since Nahuala and the first during the Ánima Estudios era. In another series first, the film was released in the United States on 14 October 2016, one week prior to its release in Mexico. Distributed by Pantelion Films, a major American film distributor for Latin American-themed films, the film was shown in the original Spanish-language format with English subtitles. Despite receiving negative reviews, the film is another major box-office success, grossing a total of $100.7 million pesos (US$5.4 million), and is the series' first to surpass the $100 million peso-mark as well as the second-highest grossing film within. While the Mummies voice cast return for the fourth film, Rafael Inclán did not return to voice Alebrije, as he was replaced by dubbing actor Herman López. Ricardo Arnaiz, creator of the franchise, was not involved in the production of this film.

The Legend of the Black Charro (2018)

The Legend of the Black Charro, the fifth entry, was released on 19 January 2018, as opposed to previous films which were normally released in October. It picks up from Chupacabras where Leo San Juan and his brother Nando head home to Puebla. Along the way, Leo encounters the 'Black Charro' who mistakes him and causes a girl to be cast into the underworld. He enlists the help of his friends to correct his mistakes and take on the 'Black Charro' once and for all. Black Charro marks the return of some of the past films' characters, such as Don Andrés and Xochitl, while also featuring cameos of other returning characters and references from the entire franchise. Along with the returning voice cast of the Mummies and Chupacabra, Mexican actor Erick Elías voices the 'Black Charro'. It proved to be another commercial success, earning a total of $100.8 million pesos; the highest-grossing Legend Quest film to date.

Legend Quest: The Origin (2022)

A spin-off prequel film, titled Legend Quest: The Origin, focuses on the Calavera duo, Finado and Moribunda, who must look after a human baby when he crosses the Espejo Eternal ("eternal mirror") through a portal that separates the Realm of the Living and the Dead. The film, first teased on Twitter, was originally scheduled for a 2020 theatrical release, but was delayed due to the COVID-19 pandemic.

Franchise future
While Black Charro has been rumored to be the last film in the franchise, director Alberto Rodríguez has stated the possibility of a new film, due to the amount of potential and "many more doors to explore", but would require the creation of new characters.
Andrés Couturier, the voice of Don Andrés and manager at Ánima Estudios, said that he wouldn't be "surprised to see crossovers or spin-offs of Las Leyendas." Rodríguez stated that Black Charro would be his last film, as he has expressed interest in making new projects outside of the franchise. "I feel that my cycle is already finished in terms of [Legend Quest]. I already want to do other things, but we are still involved in the development of other things that come for the Legend Quest," he said.

On the Day of the Innocents, a "prank" teaser for a "live action" installment was released on December 28, 2020, which was said to be released in 2022.

It emerged that a new installment, titled La leyenda de los Chaneques, is planned for development, based on the discovery of an artist's portfolio.

Television series

A Netflix original series based on the characters, named Legend Quest (Las Leyendas), premiered in 2017 in 30 languages, making it the platform's first original animated series produced in Latin America.

The 2019 TV series Legend Quest: Masters of Myth is a Netflix original production with Ánima Studios. The series is direct continuation from Legend Quest, featuring characters from the Legends Mexican movie franchise and Legend Quest, the only difference being that both Leo and Teodora are teenagers in the show.

Voice cast (Spanish)

Crew

Box-office results

See also
Ánima
Huevocartoon
Animex Producciones

References

External links
Leyendas Ánima on YouTube
Las Leyendas on Twitter

Film franchises introduced in 2007
Animated film series
Horror film franchises
Comedy film franchises
Children's film series
Comedy franchises
Mexican animated films
Flash animated films